Arthur Legge may refer to:

Arthur Legge (British Army officer) (1800–1890), British soldier and politician
Arthur Legge (footballer) (1881–1941), Australian sportsman
Sir Arthur Kaye Legge KCB (1766–1835), Royal Navy officer